Anupam Dutta is an Indian music director and composer. He mainly contributed to the Bengali films directed by Swapan Saha.

Discography

Composer

 Bhagya Chakra (2008)
 Greptar (2007)
 Sanghat (2007)
 Arjun (2006)
 Khalnayak (2006)
 Sukh Dukkher Sansar (2003)
 Ostad (2001)
 Shasti (2001)
 Shesh Ashray (2001)
 Mayna (2000)
 Parichay (2000)
 Sajoni Aamar Sohag (2000)
 Chena Achena (1999)
 Daye Dayitwa (1999)
 Sundar Bou (1999)
 Swamir Ghar (1999)
 Banglar Badhu (1998)
 Ganga (1998)
 Jiban Trishna (1998)
 Praner Cheye Priyo (1998)
 Putrabadhu (1998)
 Sindurer Adhikar (1998)
 Sundari (1998)
 Swamir Aadesh (1998)
 Adarer Bon (1997)
 Bhalobasa (1997)
 Matir Manush (1997)
 Mittir Barir Chhoto Bou (1997)
 Pabitra Papi (1997)
 Pita Mata Santan (1997)
 Sabar Upare Maa (1997)
 Yoddha (1997)
 Abujh Mon (1996)
 Bbhai Amar Bhai (1996)
 Bhoy (film) (1996)
 Kencho Khunrte Keute (1995)
 Naginkanya (1995)
 Sansar Sangram (1995)
 Shesh Pratiksha (1995)
 Sujan Sakhi (1995)

References

External links
 
 Anupam Dutta in Gomolo

Living people
Bengali musicians
Indian musicians
Indian male musicians
Indian film score composers
Indian Hindus
Bengali Hindus
Year of birth missing (living people)
Indian composers
Indian male composers
21st-century Indian composers
Musicians from Kolkata